Nablus Library is the oldest and largest public library in the West Bank. The library was established by the municipality of Nablus with aid from the Jordanian government in 1960. The building itself is a 19th-century Ottoman-era structure, which was a cafe in its former life. Surrounding the library building is a garden, used as a community space for lectures and events. During the First Intifada, while most schools and universities in the West Bank were shuttered, Nablus Library remained open. In the late 1990s, the library opened a children's department for the first time. As of late 2013, the library was constructing an audiovisual room.

Nablus Library's circulating collection includes approximately 80,000 books, majority of which are in Arabic. Besides the circulating collection, Nablus Library also houses several significant archival collections, including the so-called Prisoner's Section, an archive of materials made and used by Palestinian prisoners held in Israeli jails between 1975 and 1995, as well as the personal collection of Qadri Tuqan, a Nablusi educator and one of the founders of An-Najah College, now An-Najah National University. Other collections include Palestinian newspapers dating back to the 1920s, as well as a collection of sharia court documents from northern Palestine spanning the length of the Mandate Period. Nablus Library also houses doctoral theses donated by students from An-Najah National University.

In 2000, Nablus Library claimed to have approximately 500 visitors per day and 300 books lent out per day. According to the International Federation of Library Associations and Institutions, in 2000 the library had 27 employees, 4 of which were educated in library science. Today the library has 46 employees.

Prisoner's section 
The collection includes 8,000 volumes of published books and 870 notebooks made and used by Palestinian prisoners held in Israeli jails between 1975 and 1995. A large segment of the material is from the Nablus Jail, the veritable fount of the Palestinian prisoner self-education movement. Most Israeli jails in the 1960s did not have prison libraries; often books were prohibited. Nablus Jail was unique in that it included a small library for detainees, carried over from its time under Jordanian administration. A 1972 visit by the Red Cross concluded with the vast expansion of the library to include poetry, religious texts, books on Zionism, Marxism, Leninism, and economic theory, among others. Utilizing this expanded library, detainees created a thriving intellectual culture within Nablus Jail; this self-education movement spread to other Israeli-operated detention facilities as well. Detainees at Nablus Jail often hand-copied books to send to other jails which lacked libraries.

In the wake of the Oslo Accords, several Israeli-operated detention facilities, including Nablus Jail, were closed. The contents of the prison libraries were donated to Nablus Library in 1996.

See also 
 List of libraries in the Palestinian territories

References

External links 
 Nablus Library 

1960 establishments in the West Bank Governorate
Public libraries
Libraries in Nablus